Brunella Schisa (born Naples, 20 October 1953) is an Italian novelist and journalist. She was the recipient of the Rapallo Carige Prize for La donna in nero in 2007.

References

Italian women novelists
21st-century Italian women writers
21st-century Italian novelists
Italian women journalists
20th-century Italian journalists
21st-century Italian journalists
1953 births
Living people
20th-century Italian women